The economy of Montenegro is currently in a process of transition, as it navigates the impacts of the Yugoslav Wars, the decline of industry following the dissolution of the Yugoslavia, and economic sanctions imposed by the United Nations. Montenegro joined the World Trade Organization on 29 April 2012. Montenegro joined the North Atlantic Treaty Organization on 5 June 2017. The accession of Montenegro to the European Union is planned for 2025.

History 

As a relatively small principality founded in 1852, Montenegro's economy was originally wholly based in agriculture, but it began developing an industrial economy at the turn of the 20th century. Growth was hampered by its small population, lack of raw materials, an underdeveloped transport network, and a comparatively low rate of domestic and international investment.

The first industrial enterprises built in Montenegro were wood mills, an oil refinery, a brewery, salt works, and electric power plants. Economic development was interrupted by several wars, including the First Balkan War (1912–13), World War I (1914–18), and World War II (1939–45). Throughout the first half of the 20th century, agriculture continued to dominate Montenegro's economic activity.

The Yugoslavian era
Montenegro's economy was developed significantly after World War II, as the country was integrated into the Socialist Federal Republic of Yugoslavia and experienced a period of rapid urbanization and industrialization. Its industrial sector included the generation of electricity, steel and aluminum production, coal mining, forestry and wood processing, textiles, and tobacco manufacturing, while international trade, shipping, and tourism became increasingly important by the late 1980s.

Post-Yugoslavia
Following the dissolution of Yugoslavia in the early 1990s, Montenegro's entire industrial production system effectively collapsed, leading to shortages of many goods and skyrocketing prices for them. Due to its political alliance with Serbia and favourable geographic location, with access to the Adriatic Sea and a shipping-link to Albania across Lake Skadar, Montenegro became a hub for smuggling activity during the 1990s. The smuggling of petrol and cigarettes, in particular, became a de facto legalised practice within the country.

Dissolution of State Union with Serbia
In 1997, Milo Đukanović took control of Montenegro's ruling party, the Democratic Party of Socialists of Montenegro, and began severing political ties with Serbia. He blamed the policies of Serbian President Slobodan Milošević for the overall decline of the Montenegrin economy. Resurgent inflation led the Montenegrin government to "dollarize" the economy, adopting the German mark as its dominant currency. These economic policies also led to a revision of the relationship between the two countries from a federal republic to a much looser political union of Serbia and Montenegro, in which the Montenegrin government assumed responsibility for its own economic policies.

Montenegro subsequently opened up many of its economic sectors to privatization and introduced a value-added tax (VAT) to raise funds for public projects. It would later replace the German mark with the Euro as its legal tender, despite objections from Brussels. However, the implementation of these economic "reforms" did not significantly improve the living standard of Montenegrins during this period.

The Montenegrin government blamed its problems on Serbia, which suffered from a higher level of foreign debt and unemployment, as well as an investigation by the Hague war crimes tribunal and controversy over the independence of its province of Kosovo. These factors hampered Montenegro's attractiveness to investors and delayed its progress toward full membership in the European Union and NATO.

On 21 May 2006, the people of Montenegro voted by referendum to declare independence from Serbia

Post-independence
Following the independence referendum, Montenegro's economy has evolved to highlight its service sector, with a goal of becoming an elite tourist destination, and is navigating the process of joining the European Union. Attempts to attract foreign investors for large infrastructure projects are ongoing, as these projects are integral to its development as a tourist destination.

Montenegro experienced a real estate boom in 2006 and 2007, with wealthy Russians, Britons and others buying property on the Montenegrin coast. As of 2008, Montenegro received more foreign investment per capita than any other nation in Europe. However, the Great Recession did slow economic growth, as several infrastructure projects, such as the development of Velika Plaža, Ada Bojana, Buljarica, Jaz Beach, and the construction of the Bar-Boljare motorway and new power plants had to be postponed. The recession was also very difficult for the Podgorica Aluminium Plant, which was initially built in 1969 and was the biggest single contributor to the Montenegrin gross domestic product. The plant, first sold to Oleg Deripaska's En+ Group in 2005, declared bankruptcy in 2013 and was sold to local magnate Veselin Pejovic's Uniprom in 2014.

In the first half of 2012, Montenegro exported goods, mostly metals, worth €182.3 million, which was 14.6% less than in the same period of the preceding year. Its major export partners include Croatia, Serbia, Bosnia and Herzegovina, and Hungary. Montenegro's imports in the first half of 2012, mostly food, oil, and electrical energy, were worth €864.9 million, which was 2.6% more than the same period in 2011. Its major import partners include Serbia, Greece, and Bosnia and Herzegovina.

The banking sector of Montenegro has a significant share of foreign capital. Banks in Montenegro provide both retail and corporate banking products under one roof, and most offer non-resident accounts, usually to both natural persons and legal entities.

The Port of Bar is the country's primary communication with the maritime trade. Its terminal is specialized in bulk shipment of bauxite and other ores, grain, wood products acetic acid and petroleum derivatives. In 2019 its allowable draft was reported as 12.8m and several private storage tanks exist on site, to service trade. According to a EU subsidy project document, it was noted in 2019 that Volujica quay had deteriorated and degraded rapidly in the previous several years. Ro–Ro traffic from Bari and Ancona is handled through an operational quay which is 400m long with water depth of between 4m and 5.9m.

Taxation 
In addition to VAT, a tax rate of 9% is applied to monthly personal gross income below €751 per month, and a tax rate of 11% is applied for income above that. Montenegrin municipalities also apply an income tax surcharge equivalent to 15% of the national tax rate. Additional income reported in an annual tax return is also subject to a 9% tax rate.

Agriculture of Montenegro
In July 2006 prior to EU integration efforts a survey document was produced by the Ministry of Agriculture, Forestry and Water Management for the EU-funded project Agriculture and Rural Development Strategy of Montenegro. The Statistical Office of Montenegro learned as late as November 2021 how to collect its data in formats acceptable to the European Commission.

Since 2010 agricultural trade relations between the EU and Montenegro have been governed by the EU-Montenegro Stabilisation and Association Agreement, and with the exception of beef, sugar and wine all agricultural products originating in Montenegro can enter the EU duty free. The EU has a large agri-food trade surplus with Montenegro, and exports meat, dairy and food preparations. The EU mainly imports vegetables such as mushrooms, wine and oils from Montenegro.

It was reported by the EC Directorate-General for Agriculture and Rural Development in March 2019 that the share of agriculture in Montenegro's GDP was 8%. Agricultural land accounts for 38% of the total. Olives and citrus fruits are grown in the coastal region, while seasonal vegetables and tobacco are produced in the central areas. In the north of the country ungulates dominate the farming. The largest share of the land consists of pasture and grassland.

Montenegro became a member of the UN International Fund for Agricultural Development (IFAD) in 2015, which notes that the rural population represents one-third of the total. In 2019 the IFAD focused its activities "on the key challenges of better connectivity and higher productivity by (i) fostering the graduation of micro and small agricultural holdings from the current non-viable subsistence-type agriculture toward semi-commercial and commercial agriculture, through investments in pro-poor rural infrastructure, (ii) promoting the aggregation of smallholders within inclusive value chain clusters and (iii) supporting the proactive role of municipalities to deploy investment to promote inclusion for entire sectors of the rural population."

Over the years 2009 to 2019 the World Bank contributed a development project called the Montenegro Institutional Development and Agriculture Strengthening Project, by which (amongst other highlights) the food safety system was upgraded in EU compliant manners, a Border Inspection Post with veterinary and phyto-sanitary controls was established in the Port of Bar, an electronic farm register was created, procedures for the classification of farm and food  establishments were completed according to EU norms, and the Veterinary Diagnostic Laboratory in Podgorica was accredited in ISO 17025 analysis methods.

See also 
Outline of Montenegro#Economy and infrastructure of Montenegro
Geography of Montenegro
Geology of Montenegro
History of Montenegro
Economy of Serbia and Montenegro

Notes

References

External links 

Montenegro Economy and Financial News
The Njegoskij Fund Public Project >> Country Profile on Montenegro
CIA World Factbook - Montenegro
A New Playground for the Rich, a slideshow by The New York Times.

 
Montenegro